Supercross 2000 is a racing game based on the sport of Supercross. It was published by EA Sports for PlayStation and Nintendo 64 consoles in North America on October 31, 1999, and in Europe in February 2000. Its sequel, Supercross was released in November 2000.

Gameplay
Supercross 2000 contains a range of game modes. These game modes include:

 The Season, Quick Race and Single Race put you on one of the 16 stadium tracks where you race against one of the 25 pro riders featured in the game.
 Quick Freestyle, in which players are given an allotted period of time to perform as many stunts as possible.
 Single Race, in which up to two players race on 16 Supercross tracks or 5 amateur tracks.
 Freestyle, in which up to two players compete with the goal of performing the most stunts in an allotted period of time.
 Practice, in which a player may practice racing on the provided tracks.
 Season, in which one player competes in races across the 16 Supercross tracks.

Supercross 2000 is licensed by the AMA and by Pace Motor Sports. It includes all 16 real stadium tracks from the series, as well as 25 of the Supercross and freestyle riders from the 1998 season.

Features
 Recreations of factory bikes with accompanying physics simulations.
 Play-by-play announcing from ESPN commentators David Bailey and Art Eckman.
 The simulation of tracks wearing down during the course of each race, which gradually develops into grooves and ruts.
Nintendo Pak peripheral support, including for the Controller Pak, Rumble Pak, and Expansion Pak.

Riders
 Jeff Emig
 Stefy Bau
 Kevin Windham
 Mike LaRocco
 Mike Metzger
 Greg Albertyn

Soundtrack
The Living End – "Prisoner of Society"
The Living End – "I Want A Day"
MxPx – "The Next Big Thing"
Pulley – "Over It"
All – "Perfection"
40 Watt Domain – "Bubble"

Reception

The game received mixed/average reviews on both platforms according to video game review aggregator GameRankings.

References

External links
 

1999 video games
Electronic Arts games
Motorcycle video games
Nintendo 64 games
PlayStation (console) games
Multiplayer and single-player video games
Video games scored by Jerry Martin
Video games developed in the United States